Lazy Line Painter Jane was Belle & Sebastian's second EP, released in 1997 on Jeepster Records. The title track features guest vocalist Monica Queen and was recorded in a church hall. "A Century of Elvis" features bassist Stuart David reading out a story he had written, over music by the band. The backing music from that track was later used on "A Century of Fakers" from 3.. 6.. 9 Seconds of Light. The front cover features Thea Martin holding Reason and Reality: The Relationship Between Science and Theology by John Polkinghorne. The EP was later re-packaged as part of the Lazy Line Painter Jane box-set, and all four tracks were collected on the Push Barman to Open Old Wounds compilation. The EP narrowly missed out on a top 40 placing in the UK singles chart, reaching #41.

Reception
Reviewing the title track, PopMatters said, "There’s really nothing like the sinister tone of “Lazy Line Painter Jane” anywhere else in the Belle and Sebastian catalog, which came as even more of a surprise when it appeared early in the group’s discography. The darker mood of the song, its throbbing bass, proving they could be a full-on, locked-in rock band with chops and an intuitive feel."

Track listing

Release details
 CD (JPRCDS002)
 12" vinyl (JPR12002)
 7" vinyl (JPR7002)

References

External links
Lazy Line Painter Jane at belleandsebastian.com
Lazy Line Painter Jane at jeepster.co.uk

Belle and Sebastian EPs
1997 EPs
Jeepster Records EPs